Alex Anmahian is a Boston-based architect, co-founding partner of Anmahian Winton Architects and a faculty member of the Graduate School of Design, Harvard University's department for architecture. He received his BA from the University of Florida and his MArch from Harvard. His firm designed the Innovation Centre for Orange, one of Britain's leading cellular telephone companies.

Anmahian's firm has won many awards from the American Institute of Architects, the Boston Society of Architects (BSA), the Business Week/Architectural Record Award, and also Architecture magazine's Home of the Year Citation. The firm won the BSA Unbuilt Architecture Award for the design of a new Horticulture Support Facility at the Arnold Arboretum of Harvard University.

Awards
Merit Award for Excellence in Architecture, Society for College and University Planning (SCUP), 2014 - Joukowsky Institute, Brown University, Providence, Rhode Island and Providence Plantations
Honor Award for Design Excellence - Award, Boston Society of Architects, 2013 - Red Rock House, Red Rock, New York
Institute Honor Awards for Architecture, American Institute of Architects, 2014 - Community Rowing Boathouse, Boston, Massachusetts
Honorable Mention, 2013, Architect Magazine - Red Rock House, Red Rock, New York
Honor Award for Interior Architecture, American Institute of Architects, 2012 - Joukowsky Institute, Brown University, Providence, Rhode Island and Providence Plantations
Honor Award for Design Excellence, Boston Society of Architects, 2011 - Joukowsky Institute, Brown University, Providence, Rhode Island and Providence Plantations
American Architecture Award, Chicago Athenaeum, 2011- Joukowsky Institute, Brown University, Providence, Rhode Island and Providence Plantations
IES Illumination Award for Lighting, 2011 - Joukowsky Institute, Brown University, Providence, Rhode Island and Providence Plantations
R+D Awards - Citation, 2010 - Community Rowing Boathouse, Boston, Massachusetts
Housing Design Award, American Institute of Architects, 2010 - Blue Rock House, Austerlitz, New York
Building of America Award, Gold Medal, 2010 - Joukowsky Institute, Brown University, Providence, Rhode Island and Providence Plantations
Special Mention Award, American Institute of Architects-New England, 2009 - Blue Rock House, Austerlitz, New York
Harleston Parker Medal, Boston Society of Architects, 2009 - Community Rowing Boathouse, Boston, Massachusetts
Honor Award for Design Excellence, Boston Society of Architects, 2009 - Community Rowing Boathouse, Boston, Massachusetts
American Architecture Award, Chicago Athenaeum, 2008 - Community Rowing Boathouse, Boston, Massachusetts
P/A Award, 2008 - Community Rowing Boathouse, Boston, Massachusetts
Unbuilt Architecture Award, Boston Society of Architects, 2006 - Horticulture Support Facility, Arnold Arboretum, Jamaica Plain, Massachusetts
Preservation Award, Town of Brookline, 2004 - Buckminster Hall, Brookline, Massachusetts
Honor Award for Design Excellence, Boston Society of Architects/AIA New York Housing Design Awards Program, 2004 - Minneapolis Loft, Minneapolis, Minnesota
Honor Award for Outstanding Interiors, American Institute of Architects, 2004 - American Meteorological Society, Boston, Massachusetts
Business Week/Architectural Record Award, 2003 - Orange Labs, Cambridge, Massachusetts
Architecture Magazine Home of the Year Citation, 2003 - Minneapolis Loft, Minneapolis, Minnesota
Honor Award for Design Excellence, Boston Society of Architects, 2003 - American Meteorological Society, Boston, Massachusetts
Award for Design, Boston Society of Architects, 2003 - Cambridge 1, Cambridge, Massachusetts
Award for Design, Boston Society of Architects, 2003 - Seterdahl/Bull Residence, Amherst, Massachusetts
Honor Award for Design Excellence, American Institute of Architects-New England, 2003 - American Meteorological Society, Boston, Massachusetts
Citation for Residential Design, American Institute of Architects-New England, 2003 - Seterdahl/Bull Residence, Amherst, Massachusetts
Citation for Interior Design, American Institute of Architects-New England, 2003 - Orange Innovations, Cambridge, Massachusetts
Young Architects Award, Boston Society of Architects, 1999 - Minneapolis Pathways, Minneapolis, Minnesota
Honor Award for Outstanding Architecture, American Institute of Architects, 1999 - Minneapolis Pathways, Minneapolis, Minnesota
Special Recognition for Design, American Institute of Architects–New England, 1998 - Warner Residence, Cambridge, Massachusetts
Young Architect's Design Award, University of Florida, College of Architecture, 1998
Unbuilt Architecture Award, Boston Society of Architects, 1996 - Bowling Hall of Fame
Urban Design Award, Boston Society of Architects, 1995 - Science Park MBTA Station, Boston, Massachusetts
Honor Award for Design Excellence, American Institute of Architects-New England, 1995 - Minneapolis Pathways, Minneapolis, Minnesota

External links
Anmahian Winton Architects Website
ARCHITECT Visits: Anmahian Winton
Harvard University's Graduate School of Design

Harvard Graduate School of Design alumni
University of Florida College of Design, Construction and Planning alumni
Harvard Graduate School of Design faculty
Living people
Arnold Arboretum
Architects from Boston
1959 births